The 2020–21 Wisconsin Badgers women's basketball team represented the University of Wisconsin at Madison during the 2020–21 NCAA Division I women's basketball season. The Badgers were led by fifth-year head coach Jonathan Tsipis and play their home games at the Kohl Center as members of the Big Ten Conference.  They competed in the 2020–21 Big Ten Conference season and the 2021 Big Ten women's basketball tournament.

Previous season 
The Badgers finished the 2019–20 season 12–19, including 3–15 in Big Ten play to finish in 12th place. They lost in the second round of the Big Ten women's tournament to Rutgers after beating Illinois.

After the season, the team lost four players to graduation and three players to transfers, but added two players as transfers.

Roster

Recruiting Class

Sources:

Schedule and results

|-
!colspan=9 style= | Non-conference regular season

|-
!colspan=9 style=| Big Ten regular season

Source

See also
2020–21 Wisconsin Badgers men's basketball team

References

Wisconsin Badgers women's basketball seasons
Wisconsin
Wisconsin Badgers women's basketball
Wisconsin Badgers women's basketball